Black hearts may refer to:
Black Hearts: One Platoon's Descent into Madness in Iraq's Triangle of Death
Fly Black Hearts
Black Hearts in Battersea
Black Hearts (On Fire)
Dawn of the Black Hearts

See also
Black Heart (disambiguation)
Blackheart (disambiguation)